Ivan Filatov (born 11 March 1988) is a Kyrgyz professional footballer who plays as a forward.

Club career

Kyrgyzstan
Born and raised in Bishkek, Kyrgyzstan, Filatov began his professional footballing career in 2007 with Kyrgyzstan Second League side, FC Nashe Pivo. In his two-year spell with the Kant-based side, he finished with 40 goals in 58 appearances.

Impressed with his display in the lower division, Kyrgyzstani giants, FC Abdysh-Ata Kant confirmed him as their main forward for the next two seasons. He scored 26 goals in 40 appearances in his two-year spell for the Kyrgyzstan League side.

Later in 2011, Filatov moved to Bishkek where he signed a two-year contract with another Kyrgyzstan League side, FC Alga Bishkek. He scored 27 goals in 40 appearances for the Bishkek-based side.

In 2013, he moved back to Kant where he signed a short-term contract with his former side, Abdysh-Ata Kant. He scored 7 goals in 12 appearances in the 2013 Kyrgyzstan League.

Later in the season, he signed a two-year contract with his former side, Alga Bishkek. He scored 22 goals in 30 appearances in his two-year stint at the club.

Oman
Filatov first moved out of Kyrgyzstan in 2016 to Oman where on 17 January he signed a short-term contract with Oman Professional League side, Sohar SC. He made his Oman Professional League debut on 18 January 2016 in a 2–1 loss against Sur SC and scored his first goal on 22 January 2016 in a 3–3 draw against Dhofar S.C.S.C. He also made his debut in the Oman Professional League Cup on 27 March 2016 in the finals in a 1–0 loss against Al-Nasr S.C.S.C. He scored 3 goals in 9 appearances in the 2015–16 Oman Professional League.

Back to Kyrgyzstan
Later in 2016, he moved back to Kyrgyzstan and more accurately to his former club, Alga Bishkek for whom he scored 5 goals in 6 games in the 2016 Kyrgyzstan League.

India
Filatov moved to India in 2017 where on 15 January, he signed a six-month contract with I-League side, Minerva Punjab FC. He made his I-League debut on 17 January 2017 in a 4–0 loss against Indian giants, Mohun Bagan A.C.

Career statistics

Club

References

External links
 
 Ivan Filatov – GOAL
 

1988 births
Living people
Sportspeople from Bishkek
Kyrgyzstani people of Russian descent
Kyrgyzstani footballers
Kyrgyzstan international footballers
Kyrgyzstani expatriate footballers
Association football forwards
Sohar SC players
RoundGlass Punjab FC players
Oman Professional League players
I-League players
FC Abdysh-Ata Kant players
FC Alga Bishkek players
Kyrgyzstani expatriate sportspeople in Oman
Expatriate footballers in Oman
Kyrgyzstani expatriate sportspeople in India
Expatriate footballers in India